George Alan Killington (born 23 May 1996 from London) is an English professional darts player who competes in Professional Darts Corporation events.

After entering the Youth Tour in 2012, he won his first title in 2014 in Wigan, defeating Germany's Max Hopp 4–2 in the final.

After taking time off darts to look after his ill mother, Killington returned in 2017, and entered UK Q-School in 2018, winning a two-year Tour Card on the third day, by defeating England's Gary Eastwood 5–3 in the final.

Darts career
Killington making his two stages on the UK Open early in Last 96, who losing to Keegan Brown of England in 2018 and Madars Razma of Latvia in 2019.

Performance timeline 

PDC European Tour

References

External links

1996 births
Living people
Professional Darts Corporation current tour card holders
People from Tottenham
English darts players